William "Bill" Viola Jr. (born April 9, 1977) is an international martial arts champion, promoter and author. He is the producer and founder of the Pittsburgh, Pennsylvania based Kumite Classic.

Early life 
Bill Viola Jr. was born in North Huntingdon, Pennsylvania. He was introduced to the art of Shotokan Karate by his father Bill Viola Sr. who is the founder of Allegheny Shotokan Karate and co-creator of the modern sport of MMA. Viola Jr. followed in his father's footsteps beginning martial arts lessons at the age of 3.

Career 

In 2019, the city of Pittsburgh named September 23 as "Sensei Viola Day" recognizing the Viola Family for their 50-year dojo anniversary. The date was symbolic as it was Viola Jr.’s son's William Viola IV's birthday.

Competition retirement 
In the summer of 1999, Viola was involved in an automobile accident on US Route 30 in North Huntingdon, Pennsylvania. He sustained a serious cervical neck fracture injury that effectively ended his competitive karate career (1981–1999).

Coaching 
Viola has remained active in martial arts serving as head coach of "Team Kumite," an all-star karate team based in Pittsburgh, Pennsylvania.  The team is noted as the most successful sport karate competition team in the Pittsburgh region, winning 12 National Black Belt League (NBL) World titles in 2013.

Kumite Classic Entertainment 
Viola graduated summa cum laude from the University of Pittsburgh in 1999 and moved to Hollywood, California, to work in the entertainment industry. He earned acceptance into the Screen Actors Guild (SAG) and American Federation of Television and Radio (AFTRA). After working with top industry professionals he established his own production company, Kumite Classic Entertainment in 1999. The company's signature event is the annual self-titled Kumite Classic, a multi-sport and fitness expo in Pittsburgh, Pennsylvania.

Viola has worked as a consultant for a number of major motion pictures, including Warrior (2011).  He is credited as an associate producer for the mixed martial arts-inspired film Tapped Out (2014).

Author 
Viola is the co-author of the mixed martial arts-inspired Tough Guys. The book chronicles CV Productions, Inc., the first mixed martial arts league in America and the introduction of the Tough Guy Contest.

Godfathers of MMA is the subject of the documentary film Tough Guys (2016) produced by MinusL Inc.

He established Kumite Quarterly Magazine in 2003. It was published until 2007.  As a freelance journalist, he was contracted by Sport Karate Magazine to cover The National Black Belt League World Games on location in Canada, Mexico and across the United States.

The commemorative release of Tough Guys (2017) peaked at No. 1 on Amazon sports category coinciding with the Showtime film Tough Guys debut.

In 2016, Viola created the Sensei Says educational curriculum and was awarded a Federal Trademark for the courses.

Producer 
Viola Jr. was an associate producer of the documentary film Tough Guys.   It was broadcast on Showtime in 2017. Viola made a cameo in Tough Guys playing his father.

He has co-produced and worked as a consultant on several films: Warrior (2011), Tapped Out (2014), Gridlocked (2015), and The Sound (2017).

Filmography

Bibliography 
Viola Jr., Bill (2014). Godfathers of MMA: The Birth of an American Sport. Kumite Classic Entertainment.
Viola Jr., Bill (2016). Go Ask Your Dad: Questions, Answers, and Stories about Fathers, Fatherhood, and Being a Parent (Volume 1). Kumite Classic Entertainment. 
Viola Jr., Bill (2017). Tough Guys. Kumite Classic Entertainment. 
Viola Jr., Bill (2020). CommonSensei: Sensei Says. Kumite Classic Entertainment. 
Viola Jr., Bill (2020). CommonSensei: Goal Pagoda. Kumite Classic Entertainment.

References

Further reading 
Allegheny Shotokan Karate Club Excels".  (April 26, 1998). Pittsburgh Tribune-Review, p. B6.  
Harvath, Les (December 19, 2008).  "An athlete for all seasons".  Pittsburgh Tribune-Review. (Ali, 1969).  
Organopoulos, Mike (September 3, 1996).  "Irwin karate club wins national title".  Tribune-Review.
"Sport Karate International Rankings" (Nov–Feb 1992/1993).   Sport Karate International, p. 53.  Issue 38/39
“1997 Sports Champions List”.  (December 26, 1997).   Slam Sports.
Cloonan, Patrick (May 25, 2005). "North Huntingdon Twp. Promoter heads Pittsburgh Sports and Fitness Festival". The Daily News, p. 11.
Gordon, Diane (March 19, 1998). "Karate athletes still dreaming".   Standard Observer, p. 1.ion) 
Gordon, Diane (March 4, 1998).  "Karate team is hopeful". Standard Observer, p. 1.
Love, Mike (May 20, 2012).  "Fitness and martial-arts enthusiasts pack Monroeville Convention Center for Kumite Classic".  Tribune-Review.

External links 
 
 

Living people
American male karateka
1977 births
Shotokan practitioners
American martial arts writers